Francisco 'Francis' Manuel Suárez Arteaga (born 6 January 1987) is a Spanish professional footballer who plays as a midfielder.

Club career
Born in Las Palmas, Canary Islands, Suárez came through local UD Las Palmas' youth system, making his senior debut with neighbouring Castillo CF whilst on loan. Upon his return, he then spent one full season with the B team, in Tercera División. On 7 January 2007 he made his first official appearance for the main squad, coming on as a 70th-minute substitute in a 2–2 away against UD Salamanca in the Segunda División championship.

In the following seven campaigns, with the club always in the second tier, Suárez acted almost exclusively as a backup, his best output consisting of 20 games in 2007–08. He scored the first of only three competitive goals during his tenure on 14 November 2007, in a 2–4 home loss to Villarreal CF in the Copa del Rey.

Suárez was loaned to SD Ponferradina of the same league for 2010–11, appearing in only one sixth of the matches and also suffering team relegation. In the 2013–14 season, he was not even given a jersey number and, in June 2014, left to sign with FC Inter Turku in the Finnish Veikkausliiga.

Suárez scored in his first-ever game in top flight football, helping Inter to a 2–1 home win over Turun Palloseura on 8 June 2014.

Personal life
Suárez's twin brother, Sergio, was also a footballer and a midfielder, and both played mostly for Las Palmas during their careers.

References

External links

1987 births
Living people
Footballers from Las Palmas
Spanish twins
Twin sportspeople
Spanish footballers
Association football midfielders
Segunda División players
Segunda División B players
Tercera División players
UD Las Palmas Atlético players
UD Las Palmas players
SD Ponferradina players
CD Izarra footballers
Veikkausliiga players
FC Inter Turku players
Francis Suarez
Francis Suarez
Spanish expatriate footballers
Expatriate footballers in Finland
Expatriate footballers in Thailand
Spanish expatriate sportspeople in Finland
Spanish expatriate sportspeople in Thailand